María Elena Hermelinda Lezama Espinosa (born 29 September 1969), known as Mara Lezama, is a Mexican journalist and politician from the Morena party. She is the current Governor of Quintana Roo, becoming the first woman to govern the state.

Political career 
She was the municipal president of Benito Juárez from 2021 to 2022. She then became the candidate supported by the Juntos Hacemos Historia alliance to become Governor of Quintana Roo in the 2022 local elections, which she won.

References 

Living people
1969 births
21st-century Mexican women politicians
Women mayors of places in Mexico
Morena (political party) politicians
Politicians from Mexico City
Politicians from Quintana Roo
Anahuac universities
Mexican Catholics
Municipal presidents in Quintana Roo
21st-century Mexican politicians
Governors of Quintana Roo
Women governors of States of Mexico